Duel Masters: Sempai Legends is 2004 role-playing video game developed by Canadian studio Mistic Software and published by Atari.

Plot
Sempai Legends follows a junior duelist, celebrating his birthday...when one of his coveted cards is stolen in the night.

Development
The game was announced in April 2003.

Reception

The game holds a rating of 69 of 100 on Metacritic.

GameSpy gave the game a 3 of 5 stating "Yup -- that's your "Yugi Sense" tingling. With Duel Masters: Sempai Legends, Atari gives gamers a new way to do their handheld card-based dueling. While it doesn't let you bang away with the 1000-plus monsters available in the Yu-Gi-Oh! games (at least not yet), it does offer somewhat deeper and more complex gameplay. Toss in the harrowing tale of a boy trying to find a stolen, priceless card, and you have a pretty solid package. There are a few rough edges, but if Atari plans on cranking out dueling games as fast as Konami does, those edges should be buffed smooth in no time"

Dave Clayman from IGN gave the game an 8 of 10 stating "Sempai Legends is clearly designed to compete with the super popular Yu-Gi-Oh! series. So how does it stack up? As I stated earlier the battle system is a matter of personal preference. However, gamers may be attracted to the more complicated duels and the individuality of the different Mana classes. At one time Magic: The Gathering was the most popular card game in the world and it will be interesting to see if its rule set can attract a new, younger audience for of Duel Masters"

Nintendo World Report gave the game an 5 of 10 praising the "Neat looking backgrounds" while criticizing the absurd storyline and noting the game is repetitive, boring, and tedious

References

Digital collectible card games
Game Boy Advance games
Game Boy Advance-only games
Role-playing video games
Video games based on anime and manga
Video games developed in Canada
2004 video games